Gustaf von Psilander (16 August 1669– 18 March 1738) was an admiral of the  Royal Swedish Navy. In 1704, Psilander fought his most famous action in the Battle of Orford Ness against a superior English force where he was defeated, the battle coming about as a result of his refusal to salute them under strict orders from his king.

Early life

Psilander was the son of a clerk in the Royal Wardrobe, who died when Psilander was eleven years old. Raised by a friend of the father, the Stockholm Alderman Johan Hagemeister, he joined the Navy as a clerk in 1687. Two years later Psilander was promoted to Gunner's Mate, and the following year to Gunner. To gain experience, and achieve promotion, Psilander joined the Dutch Navy during the Nine Years' War, serving as rating and petty officer, fighting in the Battle of Beachy Head (1690). Promoted to Sub-Lieutenant in his absence, he returned to Sweden in 1695.

Wars

At the outbreak of the Great Northern War, Captain Psilander served as Flag Captain, under Admiral Cornelius Anckarstjerna, escorting King Charles XII and the Swedish Army to Pärnu in Estonia. After having served as Frigate Captain in the Bay of Finland, he became Captain of the Öland, a Swedish ship-of-the line escorting Swedish merchantmen during the Great Northern War. During one of these expeditions, the event that made him one of Sweden's most famous sea officers occurred. Followed by a squadron of eight English ships-of-the-line and a frigate, he refused to salute the English squadron when requested to do so by William Whetstone (with Whetstone's reason being that Psilander was in English waters), being under strict orders to not lower his flags under any circumstances by his king. The ensuing battle left his ship of the line captured with fifty-three casualties, but they were eventually released and allowed to return home.

Psilander commanded a ship-of-the-line in the Battle of Køge Bay, becoming Deputy Superintendent of the Royal Navy shipyard in Karlskrona the same year. Promoted to Schoutbynacht and Admiralty Commissioner in 1712, he was also ennobled the same year. Favoured by the King's patronage since the 1704 battle, he was promoted to Vice-admiral and superintendent of Karlskrona shipyard 1714, and full Admiral in 1715. In 1716 he became governor of Gotland. The Swedish island in the Baltic was under increasing threats from the ascending Russian Navy, which was repeatedly launching raids upon it. Psilander's mission was to organize the local population in a homeland defence, but this proved unfeasible when the Russian galley fleet under Admiral Fyodor Apraksin in July 1717 carried out a week-long looting of parts of the island. He then had to devote himself to recruiting personnel and obtaining supplies and tax funds for the King's last military operations.

Later life

After the death of the King in 1718, Psilander belonged to those favoured by the new regime. He became a Baron in 1719, was suggested as Privy Councillor, and commanded a squadron that blocked the Russian Navy at Gdansk. Psilander now belonged to the political elite of the country, participating in all Parliaments from 1719 to 1732. In 1728, he was transferred to the Governorship of Kalmar Län in order to be closer to Karlskrona, the seat of the Swedish Board of Admiralty. In 1734 he was one of three naval officers proposed to be Naval Privy Counsellor, but the King chose Admiral Edvard Didrik Taube instead, and appointed Psilander president of the Admiralty Board, replacing the promoted Taube.   Psilander's older brother Johan became Comptroller of the Swedish Navy and was ennobled in 1720 under the name "Psilanderhielm".

Legacy
Gustaf von Psilander has the following vessels named after him:
  was a torpedo cruiser launched in 1899 and decommissioned in 1937 and sunk as target in 1939
  was a destroyer launched in 1926 and decommissioned in 1947

References

1669 births
1738 deaths
Swedish Navy admirals
Governors of Gotland
Age of Liberty people
Military personnel from Stockholm